Lucin may refer to:

 Lucin, Garwolin County, a village in east-central Poland
 Lucin, Zwoleń County in Masovian Voivodeship (east-central Poland)
 Lucin, Pomeranian Voivodeship (north Poland)
 Lucin, West Pomeranian Voivodeship (north-west Poland)
 Lucin, Utah, a historic ghost town in north-west Utah, USA
 Lucin Cutoff, a railroad trestle which crossed the Great Salt Lake in Utah, USA

See also
 Luzin (disambiguation)
 Lusin (disambiguation)